Keys To The City is a one-movement orchestral concerto for piano and orchestra written by the American composer Tobias Picker for the Brooklyn Bridge Centennial.

Commission and history
Picker, at the time in his late twenties, received a commission from The Brooklyn Bridge Centennial Commission to compose a work for the bridge's centennial. To prepare, Picker said:
I read Hart Crane and McCullough's "The Great Bridge." I studied its history. Visiting the bridge at different times of day and night, I observed its structure, its content and its context. I watched the light play through cables composed of billions of strands of streel. I listened from the foot bridge to the whine of the cars below. I studied paintings, poems, and songs which had been made in tribute to the bridge over the years. I even gave a champagne party for my friends on it one starry midnight. And I composed furiously.
Keys To The City premiered on May 24, 1983, at the Fulton Ferry Landing underneath Brooklyn Bridge.

References

Compositions by Tobias Picker
1983 compositions
Compositions for symphony orchestra